Ostrea permollis, the sponge oyster, is a species of bivalve mollusc in the family Ostreidae. It can be found along the Atlantic Coast of North America, ranging from North Carolina to the West Indies.

References

Ostreidae
Molluscs described in 1891